Llannerch (sometimes spelled Llanerch) was a commote in the cantref of Dyffryn Clwyd which later became the Marcher Lordship of Ruthin. Much of the land within the commote was owned by the Bishopric of Bangor.

The commote was abolished when the English system of counties was introduced to north Wales under the provisions of the Act of Union 1536 and the area became part of the county of Denbighshire. Llannerch is known as the home of the poet, Gruffydd ap Ieuan ap Llywelyn Fychan. He had four children including the poets Catrin ferch Gruffudd ap Ieuan ap Llywelyn Fychan and Alis ferch Gruffudd ab Ieuan ap Llywelyn Fychan. The name was maintained with the building of Llannerch Hall in the 16th century.

References

Geography of Denbighshire
Commotes of Gwynedd
Medieval Wales